Kyle Johansen was the Republican Majority Leader in the Alaska House of Representatives representing Alaska's 1st District from January 16, 2007 – January 14, 2013. Before he was elected to the Alaska House, he served as a legislative aid to Representative Bill Williams.

Personal life
Johansen has three children: Jacie, Makena, and Shelbi. He went to Ketchikan High School and graduated in 1985 before going on to Washington State University. He holds a Bachelor of Arts in Elementary Education from Washington State University.

References

External links
 Project Vote Smart profile
 Representative Kyle Johansen's Blog
 Kyle Johansen at 100 Years of Alaska's Legislature

1967 births
Living people
Republican Party members of the Alaska House of Representatives
People from Ketchikan, Alaska
Washington State University alumni
21st-century American politicians